St. Charles Airport  was a privately owned, public use airport located four nautical miles (7.41 km) north of the central business district of the City of St. Charles in St. Charles County, Missouri, United States. According to the FAA's National Plan of Integrated Airport Systems for 2007–2011, it was categorized as a reliever airport. The airport closed on June 30, 2010.

Although most U.S. airports use the same three-letter location identifier for the FAA and IATA, St. Charles Airport was assigned 3SQ by the FAA but had no designation from the IATA.

Facilities and aircraft 
It had one asphalt paved runway designated 09/27 which measured 3,451 by 50 feet (1,052 x 15 m) and two turf runways: 15/33 is 2,310 by 103 feet (704 x 31 m) and 18/36 is 2,145 by 100 feet (654 x 30 m).

For the 12-month period ending August 27, 2007, the airport had 40,260 aircraft operations, an average of 151 per day: 95% general aviation and 5% air taxi. At that time there were 77 aircraft based at this airport: 88% single-engine, 10% multi-engine, and 1% ultralight.  St. Charles Flying Service was based at the field and moved to the nearby St. Charles Smartt airport.

References

External links 
 Aerial photo as of March 1999 from USGS The National Map via MSR Maps
 

Defunct airports in Missouri
Airports in Missouri
Buildings and structures in St. Charles County, Missouri
Transportation in St. Charles County, Missouri